The Singapore Women's Hall of Fame is a virtual hall of fame that honors and documents the lives of historically significant women in Singapore. The hall is the creation of the Singapore Council of Women's Organisations (SCWO), and grew out of an earlier nine-member wall of fame that the organization created in 2005.

Categories of achievement
The Hall recognizes women in thirteen categories of achievement:

History
The hall of fame was launched on 14 March 2014, with 108 initial inductees. A five-person selection committee headed by Ambassador Tommy Koh selected the initial inductees from over 200 nominees; the committee took over a year to make its selections. President of Singapore Tony Tan and his wife Mary Tan – a patron of the Singapore Council of Women's Organisations – were the guests of honor at the launch, and presented some of the awards to the recipients at the launch gala. Eleven additional women were inducted in 2015, in a ceremony on International Women's Day. The Speaker of Parliament, Halimah Yacob, presented the awards to the honorees. That month The Fullerton Hotel Singapore held a photo exhibition in partnership with the Singapore Women's Hall of Fame that highlighted 108 of the inductees.

The Singapore Women's Hall of Fame accepts nominations from the public for future inductees, and people can be inducted into the Singapore Women's Hall of Fame posthumously.

Inductees
Key

Gallery

References

External links
 

Halls of fame in Singapore
Organizations established in 2014
Women's organisations based in Singapore
Women's halls of fame
2014 establishments in Singapore
Awards established in 2014